The Port of Basra, also known as Al Maqal Port, is an Iraqi port in Basra, situated on the Persian Gulf.

Location
The Port of Basra is a port located in downtown Basra City, Iraq, on the banks of the Shatt Al Arab River, 135 kilometers upstream from the mouth of the river, close to many of Iraq's giant oil and gas fields. 

Latitude: 30°22’ North, Longitude: 47°48’ East.

History

Construction
The Port of Basra began operations in 1919, having been constructed under the aegis of the British Army, who occupied Mesopotamia during the First World War. Iraq's first modern port, it was intended by the British to serve as a major commercial and mercantile hub, servicing Basra itself but also acting as a valuable economic bridge between Europe and Asia.

Iran-Iraq War
The Port of Basra ceased to be fully operational in 1980 due to the Iran–Iraq War. The majority of the combat during that eight-year conflict occurred in southern Iraq along the Iranian border, where the port sustained damage from Iranian missile and artillery attacks. The port experienced a steady decline in operations in the ensuing years, ultimately closing in 2003. The Port of Basra has recently reopened and currently receives general, project, and containerized cargo.

Operations
The port has 15 berths of which 11 are currently operational with a combined wharf length of 2,000 meters. In 2013 NAWAH opened the only fully containerized terminal at Berth 14.

NAWAH

In October 2012, North America Western Asia Holdings (NAWAH) announced a formal agreement with the Iraq Ministry of Transport and the General Company for Ports of Iraq to modernize the Port of Basra's Berth 14. The 10-year deal brings in excess of $14 million of private investment into the Port of Basra. Berth 14 was officially opened on October 27 2013, by Iraq’s Minister of Transport Hadi Al-Amiri. 

In April 2014, NAWAH Port Management entered into a further, formal agreement with Iraq’s Ministry of Transportation and the General Company for Ports of Iraq to quadruple the size of its existing terminal at the Port of Basra. As part of this 10-year agreement between NPM and the Iraq government, NPM will rehabilitate Berth 13 and incorporate it into its terminal operations at the Port of Basra.

The investment and reconstruction undertaken by NAWAH’s Iraqi-American joint venture subsidiary, NAWAH Port Management, has resulted in the first modern terminal operation at the Port of Basra, servicing containerized cargo, break bulk cargo, project cargo and reefer containers.

NAWAH Port Management's terminal at Berth 14 possesses:
 A 20,000 square meter lay down yard
 A new administrative headquarters 
 Liebherr 180 Mobile Harbor Crane
 Liebherr 645 Reachstacker

Basra
Ports and harbours of the Arab League
Transport in the Arab League